Robert Mintkiewicz (born 14 October 1947) is a French former professional racing cyclist. He rode in seven editions of the Tour de France.

References

External links
 

1947 births
Living people
French male cyclists
Sportspeople from Nord (French department)
Cyclists from Hauts-de-France